"Dance Monkey" is a song by Australian singer Tones and I, released on 10 May 2019 as the second single (first in the US) from Tones and I's debut EP The Kids Are Coming. The song was produced and mixed by Konstantin Kersting.

"Dance Monkey" topped the official singles charts in over 30 countries and peaked within the top ten of many others, including the United States. The song broke the record for the most weeks at number one on the Australian singles chart at 24 non-consecutive weeks. It also broke the record for the most weeks spent at the top of the UK Singles Chart by a female artist with 11 weeks at the top. When it hit number four in the US, it became the first top-five hit solely written by a woman in over eight years.

The song has received a number of awards. It won Best Pop Release at the ARIA Music Awards of 2019, Song of the Year at the APRA Music Awards of 2020 and Independent Song of the Year at the AIR Awards of 2020. It was also the Grand Prize winner of the 2019 International Songwriting Competition.

Lyrics
When interviewed by DJ Smallzy in July 2019 on Australian radio station Nova FM, Tones explained that Dance Monkey's lyrics are about the relationship she had with her audience when she was busking (street performing) on the streets of Australia:

"I wrote this song when I was busking, and about the pressure that I felt to always be entertaining people on the street. And if they didn't like it, when they looked at their phones they could just click something else; ... we are all so used to being entertained at the click of a button."

"So when you're [busking] on the street, .. to command [your] attention, people would be like: 'again! again!' .. 'more! more!' .. or they would just leave. So if you replace [the lyric]: 'dance for me, dance for me' with 'sing for me, sing for me,' it's pretty literal," she said.

Music video
The music video was produced by Visible Studios, directed by Liam Kelly and Nick Kozakis and released on 24 June 2019. The video follows "Mr. Tones" (Tones and I), an elderly man who sneaks out of his home to have a dance party at a golf course with other senior citizens. Due to the overcast weather on the day of filming, every shot of the music video had its sky replaced digitally. In 2020 it was added to APRA billion streams list. As of October 2022, the video has over 1.9 billion views on YouTube. The music video was filmed at Eynesbury Golf Club, Victoria, Australia.

Commercial performance

Upon reaching its tenth week at the top of the Australian Singles Chart, "Dance Monkey" broke the record for the most weeks at number one on the chart by an Australian artist. In November 2019, during its sixteenth week at number one, it broke the record for the most weeks at number one in Australia's ARIA chart history (1983–present), previously held by Ed Sheeran's "Shape of You" (2017). "Dance Monkey" also holds the record for the longest time at number one across Australian singles charts, with 24 weeks (including 21 consecutive weeks from August to late December 2019).

In the United Kingdom, "Dance Monkey" broke the record for the most weeks spent at the top of the UK Singles Chart by a female artist when it remained at the top of the chart for an eleventh week. The previous record of ten weeks was held jointly by Whitney Houston's version of "I Will Always Love You" in 1992–1993 and "Umbrella" by Rihanna and Jay-Z in 2007.

"Dance Monkey" was the sixth highest ranked global digital single of 2019 according to IFPI, moving 11.4 million converted units.

In November 2020, "Dance Monkey" was declared the most Shazamed song of all time with 36.6 million searches.

In December 2020, Dance Monkey became the third most-streamed song on Spotify with over 2.5 billion streams, making Tones the first female artist to do so.

Live performances
Tones made her debut on US television on 18 November 2019 with a performance of the song on The Tonight Show Starring Jimmy Fallon. On 10 December 2019, Tones appeared as a guest performer again in the US on The Voice. The following week, "Dance Monkey" entered the US Billboard Hot 100 top ten for the first time at number nine, and later peaked at number four on the chart.

Accolades
At the ARIA Music Awards of 2019, Tones and I was nominated for eight awards, winning four. Tones won ARIA Award for Best Female Artist and Breakthrough Artist while "Dance Monkey" won Best Pop Release and The Kids Are Coming EP won Best Independent Release. At the APRA Music Awards of 2020, "Dance Monkey" was nominated for Song of the Year, Most Performed Australian Work of the Year and Most Performed Pop Work of the Year, winning Song of the Year. At the AIR Awards of 2020, the song won Independent Song of the Year. In May 2020, "Dance Monkey" was announced as the Grand Prize winner of the 2019 International Songwriting Competition.

Personnel
Credits adapted from Spotify.
 Toni Watson – vocals, composer
 Konstantin Kersting – mixing, production
 Andrei Eremin – mastering

Charts

Weekly charts

Year-end charts

Monthly charts

Decade-end charts

Certifications

Release history

See also

 List of Airplay 100 number ones of the 2010s
 List of Airplay 100 number ones of the 2020s
 List of airplay number-one hits in Argentina
 List of best-selling singles in Australia
 List of number-one singles of 2019 (Australia)
 List of number-one hits of 2019 (Austria)
 List of Canadian Hot 100 number-one singles of 2019
 List of number-one hits of 2019 (Denmark)
 List of number-one singles of 2019 (Finland)
 List of number-one hits of 2019 (Germany)
 List of number-one singles of 2019 (Ireland)
 List of number-one songs of 2019 (Malaysia)
 List of number-one singles from the 2010s (New Zealand)
 List of number-one songs in Norway
 List of number-one singles of 2019 (Poland)
 List of number-one songs of 2019 (Singapore)
 List of number-one singles of the 2010s (Sweden)
 List of number-one hits of 2019 (Switzerland)
 List of UK Singles Chart number ones of the 2010s
 List of most-streamed songs on Spotify

References

External links
 

2019 singles
2019 songs
Tones and I songs
ARIA Award-winning songs
APRA Award winners
Canadian Hot 100 number-one singles
Dutch Top 40 number-one singles
Elektra Records singles
Sony Music singles
Irish Singles Chart number-one singles
Number-one singles in Australia
Number-one singles in Denmark
Number-one singles in Finland
Number-one singles in France
Number-one singles in Germany
Number-one singles in Greece
Number-one singles in Iceland
Number-one singles in Israel
Number-one singles in Italy
Number-one singles in Malaysia
Number-one singles in New Zealand
Number-one singles in Norway
Number-one singles in Poland
Number-one singles in Portugal
Number-one singles in Romania
Number-one singles in Singapore
Number-one singles in Sweden
Number-one singles in Switzerland
Song recordings produced by Konstantin Kersting
Songs written by Tones and I
Songs about dancing
Songs about fame
UK Singles Chart number-one singles
Ultratop 50 Singles (Flanders) number-one singles
Ultratop 50 Singles (Wallonia) number-one singles
Songs about primates